YES – Homeland Revival and Perspective was a centre-right political party in Lithuania. The party was founded by Artūras Zuokas, the Mayor of Vilnius, in 2011.

References

Liberal parties in Lithuania
Political parties established in 2011